The Greece women's national rugby league team represents Greece in women's rugby league football. Founded in 2019 by the Greek Rugby League Association, the team played its first game in September 2019 in a friendly match against Turkey. 

Due to the COVID-19 pandemic and the politics surrounding the governance of rugby league in Greece the team did not play its first full (as opposed to a friendly) international match until September 2022, when they entered the Southern group of the 2022 Rugby League Women's European Championship B. The first home international match took place at Gorytsa Park field, Aspropyrgos on 2 October 2022.

In January 2023, a team of Australian based players of Greek heritage played an international match in Sydney against the Philippines, under national coach Stuart McLennan.

Current squad

Greece based 
The following players where named in a squad to play in the 2022 Rugby League Women's European Championship B:

Australian based 
The following Australian based players of Greek heritage represented Greece in the January 2023 international match against the Philippines.

Alexia Foster Papanicolau, Antonia Karias, Taliah Mafi, Angelina Ballas, Ebony Tsoukas, Lavinia Taukamo, Maria Posantzis, Cherish Tseros, Jonaya Bent, Mikayla Tuliatu, Christine Tsougranis, Stella Lellis, Meleanna Waters. Interchange: Jasmin Testa, Lisa Poulakis, Simone Stephen, Stephanie Glumac

Results

Full internationals 

Upcoming Fixtures:
 During 2023 and 2024 Greece are drawn to play the following three teams in Group A of the European Qualifiers for the 2025 Women's Rugby League  World Cup. Dates and hosts have been selected but the venues are yet to be announced.
  on 28 Oct 2023 in Greece.
  on 4 Nov 2023 in Greece.
  on 11 May 2024 in the Netherlands.

See also 
 Rugby league in Greece
 Greece national rugby league team (men)

References

W
W
Greece women's national rugby league team